The French National Road Race Championship is a cycling race where the French cyclists decide who will become the champion for the year to come. The event was established in 1899, a professional championship was established in 1907 and the women's championship was established in 1951. Several additional categories were added later. The record for victories is by one of the best female cyclists, Jeannie Longo, who has so far won 20 road championships.

The winners of each event are awarded with a symbolic cycling jersey which is blue, white and red, just like the national flag, these colours can be worn by the rider at other road racing events in the country to show their status as national champion. The champion's stripes can be combined into a sponsored rider's team kit design for this purpose.

Men

Women

Amateur men

Under 23 men

Under 23 women

Junior men

Junior women

See also
French National Time Trial Championships
National road cycling championships

Notes

References

External links
Cycle Base results

National road cycling championships
Cycle races in France
Recurring sporting events established in 1899
1899 establishments in France
National championships in France